Ntsoralé is a village on the island of Grande Comore in the Comoros. According to the  1991 census, the village in the Dimani region had a population of 1,711.

References

Populated places in Grande Comore